Antonio Blanco may refer to:
Antonio Blanco (painter) (1912-1999), a painter of Spanish and American descent.
Antonio Blanco Freijeiro (1923-1991), a Spanish archaeologist and historian.
Antonio Blanco (footballer) (born 2000), Spanish footballer